Jürgen Nolte (born 19 November 1959) is a German fencer. He competed in the individual and team sabre events for West Germany at the 1984 Olympic games in Los Angeles,  1988 Summer Olympics in Seoul, and for Germany at the 1992 Summer Olympics in Barcelona.

References

External links
 

1959 births
Living people
German male fencers
Olympic fencers of West Germany
Olympic fencers of Germany
Fencers at the 1984 Summer Olympics
Fencers at the 1988 Summer Olympics
Fencers at the 1992 Summer Olympics
Sportspeople from Bonn
20th-century German people